The Kalenga by-election was a by-election held for the Tanzanian parliamentary constituency of Kalenga. It was triggered by the death of William Mgimwa, the previous Member of Parliament (MP) and former Finance Minister, who had held the seat for the Chama Cha Mapinduzi since 2010. The by-election took place on 16 March 2014 and the CCM candidate won by a landslide.

Results

References

By-elections in Tanzania
2014 elections in Tanzania
March 2014 events in Africa